The passage of the Canadian Charter of Rights and Freedoms in 1982 allowed for the provision of challenging the constitutionality of laws governing prostitution law in Canada in addition to interpretative case law. Other legal proceedings have dealt with ultra vires issues (whether a jurisdiction, such as a Provincial Government or municipality, has the powers to legislate on the matter). In 2013, three provisions of the current law were overturned by the Supreme Court of Canada, with a twelve-month stay of effect. In June 2014, the Government introduced amending legislation in response.

Constitutional law

20th century

Sections 193, 195 (213) 

The new formulations of section 213 found themselves under challenge in the lower courts within a year, with conflicting results 
().

Nova Scotia's Appeal Court ruled the legislation violated the guarantee of freedom of expression in the Charter of Rights and Freedoms, by constraining communication in relation to legal activity (R. v. Skinner (1987), 35 C.C.C. (3d) 203). The Alberta Court of Appeal disagreed, holding that infringement of freedom of expression was a justifiable limitation as no “clear and convincing” alternative was available for dealing with the nuisance of street prostitution (R. v. Jahelka (1987), 79 A.R. 44).

The Manitoba Court of Appeal upheld section 195.1(1)(c) on the grounds that there was no prima facie case of freedom of expression (Reference Re Sections 193 and 195.1(1)(c) of the Criminal Code, [1987] 6 W.W.R. 289).

When referred to the Supreme Court, it upheld the sections (Reference Re Sections 193 and 195.1(1)(c) of the Criminal Code, [1990] 1 S.C.R. 1123])Chief Justice Dickson for the majority (Madam Justice Wilson and Madam Justice L'Heureux‑Dubé dissenting), agreed that freedom of expression was restricted by what was now 213(1)(c) it did not infringe or deny the freedom of association guaranteed by section 2(d) of the Charter. He also held that it did not infringe the right to be treated fairly when life, liberty and security are affected by governmental action, as guaranteed by section 7 of the Charter. The reference to the court also included the bawdy house provisions which were held to not infringe the guarantee of freedom of expression provided for by section 2(b) of the Charter. Finally the impugned infringement of the freedom of expression guaranteed by section 2(b) of the Charter was justifiable under section 1 of the Charter as being a reasonable limit on a protected right.

The justification was set out in three stages:
 The court must first characterize the objective of the law (a remedy for solicitation in public places and the eradication of social nuisance from the public display of the sale of sex). This was constructed as restricted to taking prostitution off the streets and out of public view. In this respect, Dickson disagreed with the opinion of another justice that the legislative objective addressed the broader questions of the exploitation, degradation and subordination of women.
 The court must assess the proportionality of the legislation to the objectives; in particular any infringement of rights must be the minimum to achieve this. It was held the provisions were not unduly intrusive.
 The court must determine if the effects of the law so infringe a protected right that it outweighs the objective. It was held that the curtailment of street solicitation was in keeping with the interests of society, for its nuisance‑related aspects.

Section 198 
A part of section 198(1)(d) was challenged in 1991, namely that a previous conviction of keeping a disorderly house amounts to proof of the nature of the premises in subsequent proceedings. This was held to contravene sections 11(d) and 7 of the Charter (R. v. Janoff (1991), 68 C.C.C. (3d) 454 (Que. C.A.)), and became inoperative.

21st century

Ontario constitutional challenge 2007 

A legal challenge to three of Canada's many prostitution laws was filed in Ontario Superior Court in March 2007.
 
In a decision handed down by Madam Justice Susan Himel in the Ontario Superior Court of Justice on September 28, 2010, the prostitution laws were declared invalid.
 The decision was stayed and an appeal was heard in by the Ontario Court of Appeal in June, 2011.  On March 26, 2012 the Appeal court came to a decision which upheld the lower court's ruling on bawdy houses, modified the ruling on living on the avails to make exploitation a criminal offence, but reversed the decision on soliciting, holding that the effect on communities justified the limitation. Two of the five judges dissented from the last ruling, stating that the law on solicitation was not justifiable. The court continued a stay of effect of a further twelve months on the first provision, and thirty days on the second.

The Government announced it would appeal this decision on April 25, and on October 25, 2012, the Supreme Court of Canada agreed to hear the appeal. The Supreme Court also agreed to hear a cross-appeal by sex-trade workers on the Court of Appeal for Ontario's decision to ban solicitation. The Supreme Court of Canada heard the case on June 13, 2013.

British Columbia constitutional challenge 2007 
A related challenge was mounted in British Columbia in 2007

, but did not proceed due to a procedural motion by the Attorney General of Canada seeking dismissal on the grounds of lack of standing by the litigants. This was upheld by the BC Supreme Court in 2008, 

but successfully appealed in October 2010. 

The Attorney General then appealed this decision of the British Columbia Court of Appeal to the Supreme Court of Canada who released their decision on September 21, 2012. They dismissed the appeal enabling the case to once again proceed in the court of first instance.

The Supreme Court made a number of observations regarding the issues involved:
"In this case, all three factors, applied purposively and flexibly, favour granting public interest standing to the respondents. In fact, there is no dispute that the first and second factors are met: the respondents’ action raises serious justiciable issues and the respondents have an interest in the outcome of the action and are fully engaged with the issues that they seek to raise. Indeed, the constitutionality of the prostitution provisions of the Criminal Code constitutes a serious justiciable issue and the respondents, given their work, have a strong engagement with the issue...

This case constitutes public interest litigation: the respondents have raised issues of public importance that transcend their immediate interests. Their challenge is comprehensive, relating as it does to nearly the entire legislative scheme. It provides an opportunity to assess through the constitutional lens the overall effect of this scheme on those most directly affected by it...

It is obvious that the claim is being pursued with thoroughness and skill...

The impugned Criminal Code provisions, by criminalizing many of the activities surrounding prostitution, adversely affect a great number of women. These issues are also clearly justiciable ones, as they concern the constitutionality of the challenged provisions...

Some aspects of the statement of claim raise serious issues as to the invalidity of the legislation...

Granting standing will not only serve to enhance the principle of legality with respect to serious issues of direct concern to some of the most marginalized members of society, but it will also promote the economical use of scarce judicial resources"

In view of the subsequent decision by the Supreme Court of Canada, this application became moot.

Supreme Court decision 2013 
In a decision dated 20 December 2013, the Supreme Court of Canada struck down the laws in question, ruling that a ban on solicitation and brothels violated prostitutes' rights to safety. They delayed the enforcement of their decision for one year—also applicable to the Ontario sections—to give the government a chance to write new laws. Following the announcement of the decision Valerie Scott, one of the applicants, stated in the media that, regardless of the decision, sex workers must be involved in the process of constructing the new legislation: "The thing here is politicians, though they may know us as clients, they do not understand how sex work works. They won't be able to write a half-decent law. It will fail. That's why you must bring sex workers to the table in a meaningful way."

Government response to Supreme Court decision 
In response, Peter MacKay, the Minister of Justice introduced amending legislation, C-36 the "Protection of Communities and Exploited Persons Act" (PCEPA) on June 4, 2014, which received first reading. Debate on second reading began on June 11. It passed the third reading on October 6 and was approved by the Senate on November 4. On November 6, 2014, Bill C-36 received Royal Assent and officially became law.

Post-PCEPA legal developments 
In February 2020, an Ontario court judge struck down three parts of the PCEPA as unconstitutional: the prohibitions on advertising, procuring and materially benefiting from someone else's sexual services were violations of the 'freedom of expression' and 'security of the person' as defined in the Canadian Charter of Rights and Freedoms. Those provisions were later upheld, however, by the Ontario Court of Appeal in February 2022.

Case law

Section 197: Bawdy house definition 
The wording of section 197 allows of some interpretation. As noted by the Supreme Court of Canada in Cohen [1939] "Prior to 1907, a common bawdy house was defined by section 225 of the Code as “a house, room, set of rooms or place of any kind kept for purposes of prostitution,” but in that year, by 6-7 Edward VII, chapter 8, section 2, the section was repealed and a new one enacted in the same terms but with the addition at the end, of the words “or occupied or resorted to by one or more persons for such purposes.” That case reversed an Ontario Court of Appeal decision acquitting a woman convicted of offering sexual services on her own. The court pointed to the words one or more persons as clearly indicating that operating on one's own constituted a bawdy house.  

Another requisite is that a place must be resorted to for prostitution on a habitual and regular basis (R. v. Patterson  (1968), 67 D.L.R. (2d) 82 (S.C.C.)). A woman who used her own apartment, alone, but regularly was convicted (R. v. Worthington (1972), 22 C.R.N.S. 34 (Ont. C.A.)).

Another relates to the alternative definition of "the practice of acts of indecency", since this leaves open the definition of indecency, which may not be universally understood or accepted. One definition of community standards comes from the Supreme Court decision in R. v. Tremblay,  [1993] 2 S.C.R. 932. In considering nude dancing the majority held that the acts were not indecent since they did not fall below the community standard of tolerance, citing the circumstances surrounding the act, the degree of harm that could result from public exposure, and expert evidence.  No complaints had been received; the acts were in a closed room between consenting adults without physical contact, while expert witnesses suggested this was voyeurism and exhibitionism that caused no harm.

When Tremblay was used in Ontario to determine that lap dancing or table dancing was not indecent Toronto passed a by-law prohibiting close-contact dancing. However the Court of Appeal  reversed the decision on the grounds that this constituted prostitution (R. v. Mara, 27 O.R. (3d) 643).  Furthermore, the court ruled that Parliament intended to abolish prostitution as a form of violence against women, and thus the dancing exceeded public acceptability. The Supreme Court confirmed this in June 1997 holding that sexual contact constitutes prostitution and exceeds community standards.

This type of activity is harmful to society in many ways.  It degrades and dehumanizes women; it desensitizes sexuality and is incompatible with the dignity and equality of each human being.  Mr. Justice Sopinka, 26 June 1997

Section 210: Bawdy house Bawdy house keeping 
Participation alone is insufficient under 210 (1), without “some degree of control over the care and management of the premises” (R. v. Corbeil, [1991] 1 S.C.R. 83).

Section 212: Procuring 
Subsection 3 provides a presumption of offence of living on the avails, if associated with a sex worker or premise. A reverse onus such as this contravenes the presumption of evidence under section 11(d) of the Charter and was challenged. The Supreme Court found this justifiable in Downey v. R.( [1992] 2 S.C.R. 10). The majority accepted that an accused might be convicted despite the existence of reasonable doubt, for instance, a person may share accommodation with someone without necessarily living on their earnings. The Court found this a reasonable limit on the presumption of innocence because the intent was to prevent exploitation by pimps and that there was no real danger of innocent persons being found guilty if they provided evidence to the contrary, thereby constituting reasonable doubt. It was felt that this provision protected sex workers from abuse.

See also
 Wendy Babcock

References

Bibliography 

 Canadian Criminal Law Information. Prostitution and Soliciting. Bastion Law Corporation
 Lloyd Duhaime. Prostitution and Related Offenses (Canada), Vancouver BC
 Brannigan. Laws and the construction of criminal behaviours. University of Calgary 2009

External links 
 Edmonton Police Service: Legalities of Prostitution

 
Canadian criminal case law